"Looking For a Boy" is a song composed by George Gershwin, with lyrics by Ira Gershwin.

It was introduced in their 1925 musical Tip-Toes when it was performed by Queenie Smith as Tip-Toes.

References

Songs with music by George Gershwin
Songs with lyrics by Ira Gershwin
1925 songs